John Wardrop may refer to:

John Glen Wardrop, English transport analyst
Sir John Oliver Wardrop (1864–1948), English diplomat
Jack Wardrop, British swimmer